The Ngurawola were an indigenous Australian people of the state of Queensland.

Country
Their southern boundaries lay around Lake Marrakoonamooka, while their western limits were near the Coongie Lakes.

Alternative name
 Ngandanina.(?)

Notes

Citations

Sources

Aboriginal peoples of Queensland